Richard Earl Cramer (July 3, 1889 – August 9, 1960) was an American actor in films from the late 1920s to the early 1950s.

Burly, menacing and gravel-voiced, Cramer specialized in villainous roles in many low-budget westerns, but is today best remembered for his several appearances with Laurel and Hardy. He also appeared with W. C. Fields in his short film, The Fatal Glass of Beer, which Mack Sennett produced. 

He was sometimes billed as Rychard Cramer or Dick Cramer.

On Broadway, Cramer portrayed Rube in Buddies (1919) and Hernando in Sancho Panza (1923).

Partial filmography

 The Love Mart (1927)
 Sharp Shooters (1928)
 The Tiger's Shadow (1928)
 Kid Gloves (1929)
 The Lost Zeppelin (1929)
 Murder on the Roof (1930)
 Hell's Island (1930)
 Captain of the Guard (1930)
 Those Who Dance (1930)
 Big Money (1930)
 Night Beat (1931)
 The Pocatello Kid (1931)
 Hell-Bent for Frisco (1931)
 Lariats and Six-Shooters (1931)
Is There Justice? (1931)
 The Last Parade (1931)
 The Painted Desert (1931) as Provney
 Scram! (1932)
 45 Calibre Echo (1932)
 Lawless Valley (1932)
Behind Jury Doors (1932)
 Pack Up Your Troubles (1932)
 The Fatal Glass of Beer (1933)
 Alimony Madness (1933)
 The Cat's-Paw (1934)
 Western Racketeers (1934)
 The Law of the Wild (1934)
 Danger Ahead (1935)
 The Judgement Book (1935)
 A Scream in the Night (1935)
 The Outlaw Tamer (1935)
 Frontier Justice (1935)
 Sutter's Gold (1936)
 The Speed Reporter (1936)
 Where Trails Divide (1937)
 The Rangers' Round-Up (1938)
 Songs and Bullets (1938)
 Bad Boy (1939)
 The Flying Deuces (1939)
 Feud of the Range (1939)
 Arizona Frontier (1940)
 Pioneer Days (1940)
 Saps at Sea (1940)
 Double Trouble (1941)
 The Spoilers (1942)
 Rock River Renegades (1942)
 Boot Hill Bandits (1942)
 Scarlet Street (1945)
 Wild Country (1947)
 Santa Fe (1951)
 The Sellout (1952)

References

External links

 
 
 

1889 births
1960 deaths
Deaths from cirrhosis
American male film actors
American male silent film actors
People from Bryan, Ohio
Male actors from Ohio
20th-century American male actors
Male Western (genre) film actors